Edwin A. Doss  (September 14, 1914January 7, 1996) was an American fighter pilot and commander in the U.S. Air Force during World War II and Korean War. Logging more than 4,500 flying hours, Doss flew 573 combat hours and accrued 280 combat missions during his leadership in the South West Pacific Theatre and Korean War. For his two-year service as commander of the 35th Fighter Group during World War II, Doss was awarded the Distinguished Flying Cross, Legion of Merit, and the Air Medal. He received his second Legion of Merit and the Korean Ulchi medal with a Silver Star for his assignments as commander of the 49th Fighter Bomber Wing and the 3rd Bomber Wing at Kunsan, Korea.  Colonel Doss's service has been cited as integral to the development of long-range fighter tactics in the South West Pacific Theater.

After the Korean War, Doss held assignments including senior Air Force advisor to the Pennsylvania Air National Guard, Vice Commander of the 85th Air Division (Air Defense) at Andrews Air Force Base, and Deputy Commander of the Washington Air Defense Sector at Fort Lee, Virginia. In 1963, Doss was assigned to the United States Air Forces in Europe (USAFE) headquarters as Deputy Inspector General and Inspector General. In 1964, he was appointed as head of the command liaison agency to the government of France at Paris. He retired from the Air Force in 1968. He died in 1996 at age 81 in Riverside, California, and was buried at the Riverside National Cemetery.

Early life and education
Doss was born in Rector, Arkansas. He later moved to Missouri where he graduated from Portageville High School in 1932. He spent the next two years in the Civilian Conservation Corps before attending Lead Belt Junior College in Desloge, Missouri. He graduated in 1936.

Career

Early military years (1940–1941)
After being commissioned as a second lieutenant on December 20, 1940, Doss's first military assignment was to the 41st squadron of the 31st Operations Group at Selfridge Field, Michigan. There, he flew Seversky P-35 aircraft. In April 1941, he was appointed squadron operations officer.

On April 9, 1941, Doss's P-35 crashed due to mechanical failure in Selfridge Field. The plane was severely damaged.

World War II
In January 1942, Doss and his squadron were deployed to Port Moresby, New Guinea in the South West Pacific Theatre. In June of that year, he was appointed commander of the 41st Pursuit Squadron, and by 1943, he was a major in the United States Army Air Corps.

In August 1943, Doss became commander of the 35th Fighter Group, and in November, Doss was promoted to lieutenant colonel.
In 1944, under Doss's command the 35th Fighter Group set a record for the longest fighter mission in the South West Pacific Theater. After, the 35th Fighter Group continued into the Philippines. Under Doss's leadership, the group held a combat score of 397 victories and was the first fighter squadron to reach the Japanese mainland.

After leading the 35th Fighter Group through the South West Pacific Theater from Lae, New Guinea to Okinawa, Japan, Doss was promoted to colonel in 1945.

Doss's leadership as commander has been commended as integral to the advancement of long-range fighter tactics in the South West Pacific Theater. His strategic leadership received mention in a booklet that was published by World War II combat pilots of the South West Pacific.

Korean War
 In March 1953, Doss was appointed as Commander of the 49th Fighter Wing at Kunsan, Korea, where he flew a F-84G. As a combat commander, he led the 49th Fighter Bomber Wing and then the 3rd Bombardment Wing, both at Kunsan, through the end of the Korean War. He returned to the United States in April 1954.

Later military years (1954–1968)
After returning to the United States, Doss was appointed as senior Air Force advisor to the Pennsylvania Air National Guard. His next assignment was as vice commander of the 85th Air Defense Division at Andrews Air Force Base.  He then served as deputy commander of the Washington Air Defense Sector at Fort Lee, Virginia until 1960, when he was appointed commander of the Bangor Air Defense Sector. While serving as commander of the Bangor Air Defense Sector, he held the position of commander of the Bangor North American Air Defense Sector.

In 1963, Doss was appointed deputy inspector general and inspector general of the United States Air Forces in Europe (USAFE) headquarters. He served as head of the command liaison agency to the government of France at Paris from 1964 until 1966, and then deputy commander of the 25th Air Division at McChord Air Force Base until he retired from the Air Force in 1968.

Education

 1932 Graduate, Portageville High School
 1936 Graduate, Lead Belt Junior College
 1938 Student, University of Southern California
 1940 United States Army Air Corps Flying School
 1945 Command and General Staff School
 1947 Basic Military Management
 1948 Air Command and Staff School
 1954 Graduate, University of Maryland
 1958 National War College, Fort Lesley J. McNair, Washington, D.C.

Assignments

Flight information
 Rating: Command Pilot
 Flight hours: More than 4,500
 Aircraft flown: P-47, P-51, and F-84G

Awards and decorations

Badges

Effective dates of promotion

References

Bibliography
 Pilots of the Fifth Air Force. “Fighter Combat Tactics in the Southwest Pacific Area.” Merriam Press, Vermont: 2007. . 83 pages.
 Holmes, Tony, Ed.. “'Twelve to One' V Fighter Command Aces of the Pacific War”. Oxford, Great Britain: Osprey Publishing, 2004. . 129 pages.
 Wistrand, R. B. Pacific Sweep: A Pictorial History of the Fifth Air Force Fighter Command. F.H. Johnson, 1945.  ASIN: B000ZUS7DW.
 Futrell, Robert F. “The United States Air Force in Korea 1950-1953.” Government Printing Office: 2007. .

External links
 

Burials at Riverside National Cemetery
Civilian Conservation Corps people
National War College alumni
Recipients of the Air Medal
Recipients of the Distinguished Flying Cross (United States)
Recipients of the Legion of Merit
Recipients of the Philippine Republic Presidential Unit Citation
United States Army Air Forces pilots of World War II
United States Army Command and General Staff College alumni
University of Maryland, College Park alumni
1914 births
1996 deaths
People from Rector, Arkansas